Daniel Boyd (born September 14, 1956 in Martinsburg, West Virginia) is an American filmmaker, author, and communications professor. He currently teaches at West Virginia State University, has hosted writing workshops, and received a Fulbright Fellowship in 1998.

Boyd is known for his work with Troma Entertainment directing films such as Chillers, which was primarily funded through state grants. Boyd retired from directing in 2005 and went into professional wrestling. Boyd was inducted into the West Virginia Country Music Hall of Fame in 2006 for his contributions to the music genre.

Bibliography
Death Falcon vs. The Zombie Slug Lords (2008)
Chillers 
Volume 1, 2012
Volume 2, 2013
Carbon (Caliber Comics, 2014)
Salt (TBA)

Filmography

Appearances 
 Rocket Boys Festival

References

External links

1956 births
American directors
American male professional wrestlers
Country musicians from West Virginia
Film directors from West Virginia
Horror film directors
Living people
People from Martinsburg, West Virginia
Professional wrestlers from West Virginia
West Virginia State University faculty